This was a new event in the ITF Women's Circuit.

Elise Mertens won the title, defeating Melanie Oudin in the final, 6–4, 6–2.

Seeds

Main draw

Finals

Top half

Bottom half

References 
 Main draw

One Love Tennis Open - Singles